John Linnett may refer to:
 John Linnett (politician), member of the Queensland Legislative Assembly
 John Barnes Linnett, British lithograph printer
 Jack Linnett (John Wilfrid Linnett), vice-chancellor at the University of Cambridge